Babak Zarrin (born 30 July 1978) is an Iranian composer and songwriter.

Biography 
Alireza Shabani Zarrinkafsh was born in 1978 in the city of Rasht, Guilan province. In adolescence, he began piano lessons with Azadeh Pourbayram and Sohrab Falakangiz, continuing to study the musical theory in his birthplace.

He is a graduate of the Tehran Conservatory in the field of composition, counterpoint, song music, and opera singing.

Later, Zarrinkafsh became a pupil of Babak Bayat and Mohsen Elhamian. Babak Zarrinkafsh chose the artistic name of "Babak Zarrin".

Career 
Zarrin has been collaborating with renowned Iranian singers in making over 20 musical albums, as songwriter, amont them, Moein, Aref Arefkia, Salar Aghili, Mohammad Esfahani, Reza Sadeghi, Farzad Farzin, Alireza Ghorbani, Mohammad-Reza Foroutan, Ava Bahram, Mohammad Alizadeh, Hamid Hami, Mani Rahnama, Reza Bahram and Shahab Mozaffari. He also has composed several film scores and theme music for TV series and movies such as Foggy Tabriz and The Enigma of the Shah.

Awards 

 Best Titles Award, 16th Hafez Festival, 2016
 Special Award of "Khane-ye Taraneh", in commemoration of Afshin Yadollahi, 2017

References and footnotes 

  (Bibliography)
  (Bibliography)
  (Bibliography)

External links 

 معرفی بابک زرین و آثار او در وبگاه «موسیقی ما»
 بابک زرین (آهنگساز قطعهٔ «کلنل»): شاید یک آلبوم با صدای سالار عقیلی و ترانه‌های افشین یداللهی منتشر کنیم
 بابک زرین آهنگساز سریال ساخت ایران ۲ شد
 حرف‌های شنیدنیِ بابک زرین
 شروع همکاری بابک زرین با خشایار اعتمادی؛ علیرضا علیزاده معرفی می‌شود
 سرود رسمی تیم ملی فوتبال رونمایی و پخش شد؛ ۱۱ ستاره در زمین
 سورپرایز اهالی موسیقی برای کی‌روش؛ صوت و فیلم
 جزئیات همکاری بابک زرین با سالار عقیلی در کلنل یک؛ پروژهٔ ملی کلید خورد
 سالار-عقیلی-برای-کلنل-خواند سالار عقیلی برای کلنل خواند
 تولید چند اثر به خوانندگی عقیلی و اصفهانی؛ منتظر اتفاقی جالب باشید
 تمجید و حسرت هنرمندان در ترحیم افشین یداللهی

1978 births
Living people
Iranian songwriters
Iranian composers
Persian musicians
People from Rasht